Bourg-en-Bresse Cathedral (Concathédrale Notre-Dame-de-l'Annonciation de Bourg-en-Bresse) is a Roman Catholic cathedral in Bourg-en-Bresse, France.

This church was previously the collegiate church of Notre-Dame-du-Bourg, which in 1992 was raised to the status of co-cathedral of the Diocese of Belley-Ars, as the bishop and diocesan administration of Belley, later Belley-Ars, had been resident in Bourg-en-Bresse since 1978.

Artistic holdings of the cathedral include a Pietà in oil by Anne Bricollet, signed and dated 1785.

Details of the Cathedral

References

Source
 Brief account of Bourg-en-Bresse Cathedral

Roman Catholic cathedrals in France
Churches in Ain